Saeid Aghaei (born 9 February 1995) is an Iranian professional footballer who plays as a left back for Persian Gulf Pro League club Foolad.

Club career

Gostaresh
He started his career with Gostaresh in 2012–13 Azadegan League and helped them to promote to Iran Pro League with scoring 3 times in 15 appearances.

Tractor
Aghaei started 2013–14 season with Gostaresh. After few matches he joined Tractor to spend conscription period.

Persepolis 

On 1 September 2020, Aghaei signed a two-year contract with Persian Gulf Pro League champions Persepolis.

Club career statistics

International career

U17
He was part of Iran U–17 in 2010 AFC U-16 Championship.

U20
He was invited by Ali Dousti Mehr to preparation for 2014 AFC U-19 Championship.

Senior
Aghaei was called up to the senior Iran squad by Carlos Queiroz for friendlies against Macedonia and Kyrgyzstan in June 2016. He made his senior debut on 4 June 2017 against Montenegro. In May 2018 he was named in Iran's preliminary squad for the 2018 World Cup in Russia but did not make the final 23.

Honours

Club 
 Gostaresh Foolad
 Azadegan League (1): 2012–13

 Tractor
 Persian Gulf Pro League Runner up (1): 2014–15 
 Hazfi Cup (1): 2013–14 ; Runner-up (1): 2016–17

 Persepolis
Persian Gulf Pro League (1): 2020–21
Iranian Super Cup (1): 2020 ; Runner-Up (1): 2021
AFC Champions League Runner-up (1): 2020

Individual 
Persian Gulf Pro League Team of the Year (2) : 2015–16,  2016–17

References

External links

 Saeid Aghaei at IranLeague.ir

1995 births
Living people
Sportspeople from Tabriz
Iranian footballers
Gostaresh Foulad F.C. players
Tractor S.C. players
Iran under-20 international footballers
Association football wingers
Persepolis F.C. players
Foolad FC players